The Music of Madeira reflects its cultural heritage, this can be seen in the local folklore music, which in Madeira is widespread and mainly uses local musical instruments such as the machete, rajão, brinquinho and cavaquinho, which are used in traditional folkloric dances like the bailinho da Madeira.

History
Emigrants from Madeira also influenced the creation of new musical instruments. In the 1880s, the ukulele was created, based on two small guitar-like instruments of Madeiran origin, the cavaquinho and the rajão. The ukulele was introduced to the Hawaiian Islands by Portuguese immigrants from Madeira and Cape Verde. Three immigrants in particular, Madeiran cabinet makers Manuel Nunes, José do Espírito Santo, and Augusto Dias, are generally credited as the first ukulele makers. Two weeks after they disembarked from the SS Ravenscrag in late August 1879, the Hawaiian Gazette reported that "Madeira Islanders recently arrived here, have been delighting the people with nightly street concerts."

Famous musicians

 Ana da Silva
 Elisa Silva - winner of Festival da Canção 2020 with the song "Medo de Sentir".
 Luís Jardim
 Ruben Aguiar
 Maximiano de Sousa
 Pedro Camacho
 Vânia Fernandes – represented Portugal in the Eurovision Song Contest 2008 with the song "Senhora do Mar (Negras Águas)".

References

Madeiran culture
Portuguese music